The 2018–19 Lipscomb Bisons men's basketball team represented Lipscomb University in the 2018–19 NCAA Division I men's basketball season. They played their home games at the Allen Arena in Nashville, Tennessee and were led by 6th-year head coach Casey Alexander. They finished the season 29–8, 14–2 in ASUN play to finish in a share of the regular season championship with Liberty. They defeated Kennesaw State and NJIT to advance to the championship game where they lost to Liberty. As a regular season conference champion and No. 1 seed in their conference tournament who failed to win their conference tournament, they received an automatic bid to the National Invitation Tournament where they defeated Davidson, UNC Greensboro, NC State, and Wichita State to advance to the championship game where they lost to Texas.

Previous season
The Bisons finished the 2017–18 season 23–10, 10–4 in ASUN play to finish in second place. They defeated Stetson, Jacksonville and Florida Gulf Coast to become champions of the ASUN tournament. They earned the ASUN's automatic bid to the NCAA tournament where they lost in the first round to North Carolina.

Roster

Schedule and results

|-
!colspan=12 style=| Non-conference regular season

|-
!colspan=9 style=| Atlantic Sun Conference regular season

|-
!colspan=12 style=| Atlantic Sun tournament
|-

|-
!colspan=12 style=| NIT

|-

Source

References

Lipscomb Bisons men's basketball seasons
Lipscomb Bisons
2018 in sports in Tennessee
Lipscomb